St. Annes College Grammar School is a coeducational independent day school for pupils aged 2 to 18 years old in the town of Lytham St. Annes, Lancashire, England.

History
The school was founded in 1886 and moved to the current premises in 1902. It used to be known as St. Annes College for Girls. In 1984 it became an independently run school.

References

External links
 

Schools in the Borough of Fylde
Private schools in Lancashire
Boarding schools in Lancashire
Educational institutions established in 1886
1886 establishments in England